Hroznata of Úžice was a Moravian nobleman, Highest Burgrave of the Kingdom of Bohemia between 1284 and 1286, and the founder of the Talmberk family.

Hroznata was in the service of King Wenceslas II, for which he was granted land north of the Sázava River around Úžice.  was built here. The castle was first indirectly documented in 1297 through the name of Vilém of Talmberk, a son or nephew of Hroznata.

Hroznata was brother-in-law of Záviš of Falkenstein. He had several sons, including Heřman, Arnošt, Jan, and Budivoj. After a dispute with Bishop  in support of Záviš, Hroznata and his sons were declared outlaws and much of their property was confiscated. Vilém was not part of the conflict and avoided punishment.

The wax seal of Hroznata z Úžice, attached to a deed dated 24 May 1284, contains the two water lilies of the Kounice family.

References

Medieval Bohemian nobility
13th-century Bohemian people
Date of birth unknown
Date of death unknown